Virginia Montanez (also known as PittGirl) is a blogger based in Pittsburgh, U.S.A.  She anonymously wrote The Burgh Blog from 2005 to 2008, which became known for scathing portrayals of Pittsburgh Mayor Luke Ravenstahl and his administration.  In August 2008, she abruptly closed the blog, saying that someone had figured out her identity. Her Twitter profile features the question, "Have you kicked a pigeon today?"

After 8 months, she revealed her identity and launched a new blog That's Church. As a result, she lost her job at a Pittsburgh-based non-profit organization.

References

External links
That's Church
The Burgh Blog (archived)

Living people
Mass media in Pittsburgh
Writers from Pittsburgh
American bloggers
Anonymous bloggers
1974 births